Assemble Head in Sunburst Sound is a psychedelic rock band formed in San Francisco, California, in the early 2000s. Originally consisting of a trio – Michael Lardas, Jefferson Marshall, and Charlie Saufley – Assemble Head in Sunburst Sound grew to a five-piece by 2009 with the additions of multi-instrumentalists Anderson Landbridge and Camilla Saufley 

Following the band's self-released 2005 debut, which was limited to 500 copies, they signed to Tee Pee Records and have since released three studio albums: Ekranoplan (2007), When Sweet Sleep Returned (2009), and Manzanita (2012).

Discography 
 Assemble Head in Sunburst Sound (2005)
 Ekranoplan (2007)
 When Sweet Sleep Returned (2009)
 Manzanita (2012)

References 

Musical groups from San Francisco
Psychedelic rock music groups from California